Symplocos is a genus of plants in the family Symplocaceae. , Plants of the World Online recognised about 400 accepted species.

A
 Symplocos abietorum 
 Symplocos acananensis 
 Symplocos acuminata 
 Symplocos adenophylla 
 Symplocos adenopus 
 Symplocos altissima 
 Symplocos ambangensis 
 Symplocos amplifolia 
 Symplocos ampulliformis 
 Symplocos anamallayana 
 Symplocos andicola 
 Symplocos angulata 
 Symplocos annamensis 
 Symplocos anomala 
 Symplocos apiciflora 
 Symplocos aprilis 
 Symplocos araioura 
 Symplocos arborea 
 Symplocos arbutifolia 
 Symplocos arechea 
 Symplocos argenna 
 Symplocos atjehensis 
 Symplocos atlantica 
 Symplocos atriolivacea 
 Symplocos austin-smithii 
 Symplocos austromexicana 
 Symplocos austrosinensis

B

 Symplocos badia 
 Symplocos baehnii 
 Symplocos baeuerlenii 
 Symplocos banaensis 
 Symplocos baracoensis 
 Symplocos barisanica 
 Symplocos barringtoniifolia 
 Symplocos batakensis 
 Symplocos blancae 
 Symplocos bogotensis 
 Symplocos bolivarana 
 Symplocos bombycina 
 Symplocos boninensis 
 Symplocos boonjee 
 Symplocos borneensis 
 Symplocos brachybotrys 
 Symplocos bractealis 
 Symplocos brandisii 
 Symplocos breedlovei 
 Symplocos bullata 
 Symplocos buxifolia 
 Symplocos buxifolioides

C

 Symplocos caerulescens 
 Symplocos calycodactylos 
 Symplocos cambodiana 
 Symplocos candelabrum 
 Symplocos canescens 
 Symplocos carmencitae 
 Symplocos caudata 
 Symplocos celastrifolia 
 Symplocos celastrinea 
 Symplocos cerasifolia 
 Symplocos cernua 
 Symplocos chaoanensis 
 Symplocos chimantensis 
 Symplocos chloroleuca 
 Symplocos ciponimoides 
 Symplocos citrea 
 Symplocos clethrifolia 
 Symplocos coccinea 
 Symplocos cochinchinensis 
 Symplocos colombonensis 
 Symplocos colorata 
 Symplocos columbuli 
 Symplocos complanata 
 Symplocos composiracemosa 
 Symplocos condorensis 
 Symplocos cordifolia 
 Symplocos coreana 
 Symplocos coriacea 
 Symplocos coronata 
 Symplocos corymboclados 
 Symplocos costaricana 
 Symplocos costata 
 Symplocos costatifructa 
 Symplocos crassilimba 
 Symplocos crassipes 
 Symplocos crassiramifera 
 Symplocos crassulacea 
 Symplocos cubensis 
 Symplocos culminicola 
 Symplocos cundinamarcensis 
 Symplocos cuneata 
 Symplocos cuscoensis 
 Symplocos cyanocarpa 
 Symplocos cylindracea

D
 Symplocos dasyphylla 
 Symplocos debilis 
 Symplocos decorticans 
 Symplocos deflexa 
 Symplocos denticulata 
 Symplocos disepala 
 Symplocos diversifolia 
 Symplocos dolichopoda 
 Symplocos dolichotricha 
 Symplocos domingensis 
 Symplocos dryophila

E
 Symplocos ecuadorensis 
 Symplocos ecuadorica 
 Symplocos elegans 
 Symplocos elliptica 
 Symplocos estrellensis 
 Symplocos euryoides 
 Symplocos excelsa 
 Symplocos excoriata 
 Symplocos extraaxillaris

F
 Symplocos falcata 
 Symplocos fasciculata 
 Symplocos ferruginea 
 Symplocos filipes 
 Symplocos fimbriata 
 Symplocos flavescens 
 Symplocos flos-pilosa 
 Symplocos flosfragrans 
 Symplocos foliosa 
 Symplocos fordii 
 Symplocos fragilis 
 Symplocos fukienensis 
 Symplocos fuliginosa 
 Symplocos fuscata

G

 Symplocos gambliana 
 Symplocos gigantifolia 
 Symplocos gittinsii 
 Symplocos glaberrima 
 Symplocos glabriramifera 
 Symplocos glandulifera 
 Symplocos glandulosomarginata 
 Symplocos glauca 
 Symplocos glaziovii 
 Symplocos globulifera 
 Symplocos glomerata 
 Symplocos golondrinae 
 Symplocos goodeniacea 
 Symplocos gracilis 
 Symplocos graniticola 
 Symplocos groffii 
 Symplocos guacamayensis 
 Symplocos guadeloupensis 
 Symplocos guianensis 
 Symplocos guillauminii

H
 Symplocos hainanensis 
 Symplocos harroldii 
 Symplocos hartwegii 
 Symplocos hayesii 
 Symplocos heishanensis 
 Symplocos henryi 
 Symplocos henschelii 
 Symplocos herzogii 
 Symplocos hiemalis 
 Symplocos hintonii 
 Symplocos hookeri 
 Symplocos hottae 
 Symplocos hotteana 
 Symplocos huegeliana 
 Symplocos hylandii

I
 Symplocos iliaspaiensis 
 Symplocos imperialis 
 Symplocos incahuasensis 
 Symplocos incrassata 
 Symplocos inopinata 
 Symplocos insignis 
 Symplocos insolita 
 Symplocos interrupta 
 Symplocos itatiaiae

J
 Symplocos jauaensis 
 Symplocos johniana 
 Symplocos junghuhnii 
 Symplocos jurgensenii

K

 Symplocos kawakamii 
 Symplocos kemiriensis 
 Symplocos khasiana 
 Symplocos kleinii 
 Symplocos koidzumiana 
 Symplocos kothayarensis 
 †Symplocos kowalewskii 
 Symplocos kurgensis

L

 Symplocos laeteviridis 
 Symplocos lanata 
 Symplocos lancifolia 
 Symplocos lasseri 
 Symplocos latifolia 
 Symplocos laxiflora 
 Symplocos ledermannii 
 Symplocos lehmannii 
 Symplocos leiostachya 
 Symplocos leochaii 
 Symplocos leonis 
 Symplocos leucantha 
 Symplocos leucocarpa 
 Symplocos lilacina 
 Symplocos limoncillo 
 Symplocos limonensis 
 Symplocos lindeniana 
 Symplocos liukiuensis 
 Symplocos longifolia 
 Symplocos longipes 
 Symplocos lucida 
 Symplocos lugubris 
 Symplocos lutescens

M

 Symplocos macrocarpa 
 Symplocos macrophylla 
 Symplocos magdalenae 
 Symplocos maliliensis 
 Symplocos mapiriensis 
 Symplocos martinicensis 
 Symplocos megalocarpa 
 Symplocos melanochroa 
 Symplocos menglianensis 
 Symplocos mezii 
 Symplocos micrantha 
 Symplocos microcalyx 
 Symplocos microphylla 
 Symplocos microstyla 
 Symplocos migoi 
 Symplocos minima 
 Symplocos moaensis 
 Symplocos monantha 
 Symplocos montana 
 Symplocos morii 
 Symplocos mucronata 
 Symplocos multibracteata 
 Symplocos multipes 
 Symplocos myrtacea

N
 Symplocos nairii 
 Symplocos nakaharae 
 Symplocos nana 
 Symplocos naniflora 
 Symplocos neblinae 
 Symplocos neei 
 Symplocos neglecta 
 Symplocos neillii 
 Symplocos neocaledonica 
 Symplocos nigridentata 
 Symplocos nitens 
 Symplocos nitidiflora 
 Symplocos nivalis 
 Symplocos nivea 
 Symplocos nokoensis 
 Symplocos nuda

O
 Symplocos oblongifolia 
 Symplocos obovatifolia 
 Symplocos obtusa 
 Symplocos occulta 
 Symplocos octopetala 
 Symplocos odoratissima 
 Symplocos oligandra 
 Symplocos olivacea 
 Symplocos ophirensis 
 Symplocos oranjeensis 
 Symplocos oreophila 
 Symplocos oresbia 
 Symplocos organensis 
 Symplocos ovalis 
 Symplocos ovata 
 Symplocos ovatilobata 
 Symplocos oxyphylla

P

 Symplocos pachycarpa 
 Symplocos panamensis 
 Symplocos paniculata 
 Symplocos paniensis 
 Symplocos parvibracteata 
 Symplocos parvifolia 
 Symplocos patazensis 
 Symplocos paucinervia 
 Symplocos paucistaminea 
 Symplocos pealii 
 Symplocos pedunculata 
 Symplocos pendula 
 Symplocos pentandra 
 Symplocos pergracilis 
 Symplocos peruviana 
 Symplocos phaeoneura 
 Symplocos pichindensis 
 Symplocos pilosa 
 Symplocos pilosiuscula 
 Symplocos pittieriana 
 Symplocos platyphylla 
 Symplocos pluribracteata 
 Symplocos pochinii 
 Symplocos poilanei 
 Symplocos polyandra 
 Symplocos polyphylla 
 Symplocos povedae 
 Symplocos pseudobarberina 
 Symplocos psiloclada 
 Symplocos puberula 
 Symplocos pubescens 
 Symplocos pulchra 
 Symplocos pulvinata 
 Symplocos pustulosa 
 Symplocos pycnantha 
 Symplocos pycnobotrya 
 Symplocos pycnophylla 
 Symplocos pyriflora 
 Symplocos pyrifolia

Q
 Symplocos quindiuensis 
 Symplocos quitensis

R

 Symplocos racemosa 
 Symplocos ramosissima 
 Symplocos ramuliflora 
 Symplocos rayae 
 Symplocos reflexa 
 Symplocos retusa 
 Symplocos revoluta 
 Symplocos rhamnifolia 
 Symplocos rhomboidea 
 Symplocos riangensis 
 Symplocos rigidissima 
 Symplocos rimbachii 
 Symplocos rimosa 
 Symplocos rizzinii 
 Symplocos robinfosteri 
 Symplocos robinsonii 
 Symplocos robusta 
 Symplocos rubiginosa

S

 Symplocos salicifolia 
 Symplocos salicoides 
 Symplocos sanaensis 
 Symplocos sandemanii 
 Symplocos sandiae 
 Symplocos sararensis 
 Symplocos sawafutagi 
 Symplocos saxatilis 
 Symplocos scabra 
 Symplocos schiedeana 
 Symplocos schomburgkii 
 Symplocos serratifolia 
 Symplocos serrulata 
 Symplocos setchuensis 
 Symplocos shilanensis 
 Symplocos silverstonei 
 Symplocos singuliflora 
 Symplocos sonoharae 
 Symplocos sordida 
 Symplocos sousae 
 Symplocos speciosa 
 Symplocos spectabilis 
 Symplocos spruceana 
 Symplocos stawellii 
 Symplocos stellaris 
 Symplocos striata 
 Symplocos suaveolens 
 Symplocos subandina 
 Symplocos subcuneata 
 Symplocos subintegra 
 Symplocos subsecunda 
 Symplocos sukoei 
 Symplocos sulcinervia 
 Symplocos sumatrana 
 Symplocos sumuntia

T

 Symplocos tacanensis 
 Symplocos tamana 
 Symplocos tanakae 
 Symplocos tanakana 
 Symplocos tenuifolia 
 Symplocos tetragona 
 Symplocos tetrandra 
 Symplocos theifolia 
 Symplocos theiformis 
 Symplocos thwaitesii 
 Symplocos tinctoria 
 Symplocos trachycarpos 
 Symplocos trianae 
 Symplocos tribracteolata 
 Symplocos trichocarpa 
 Symplocos trichomarginalis 
 Symplocos tricoccata 
 Symplocos trisepala 
 Symplocos truncata 
 Symplocos turrilliana

U
 Symplocos ulei 
 Symplocos ulotricha 
 Symplocos umbellata 
 Symplocos unicarpa 
 Symplocos uniflora 
 Symplocos urbaniana

V
 Symplocos vacciniifolia 
 Symplocos vanderwerffii 
 Symplocos vatteri 
 Symplocos venulosa 
 Symplocos verrucisurcula 
 Symplocos verticillifolia 
 Symplocos vidalii 
 Symplocos vinosodentata 
 Symplocos violacea 
 Symplocos viridissima

W
 Symplocos weberbaueri 
 Symplocos whitfordii 
 Symplocos wikstroemiifolia 
 Symplocos wooroonooran 
 Symplocos wynadense

Y
 Symplocos yangchunensis 
 Symplocos yapacanensis

Z
 Symplocos zizyphoides

References

Symplocos